Rouge is a Brazilian pop girl group formed in 2002, through the SBT and Disney Channel talent show Popstars produced by RGB. The group comprised singers Aline Wirley, Fantine Thó, Karin Hils, Li Martins (then known as Patrícia Lissah) and Lu Andrade.

The group's debut studio album, the best-selling self-titled Rouge (2002), sold more than 1,5 million copies in Brazil. The success of the album was boosted by the songs "Não Dá pra Resistir", "Beijo Molhado" and, mainly, "Ragatanga", which helped to establish the group on a national platform. Their follow-up album, C'est La Vie (2003) produced the singles "Brilha La Luna", "Um Anjo Veio Me Falar" and "Vem Cair na Zueira", sold over 900,000 copies. After the departure of Andrade, the four remaining members continued and released the albums Blá Blá Blá (2004) and Mil e Uma Noites (2005). The group disbanded in June 2006, when the contract with Sony Music was not renewed.

Measures of their success include, have sold 6 million records sales, becoming the most successful pop girl group in Brazil and Latin America, Under the guidance of their mentor and entrepreneur, music producer Rick Bonadio, they embarked on sold-out tours throughout Brazil and several countries in Latin America, Europe and Africa. They were also stars of commercials and television programs, as well as the faces of various licensed products such as sticker albums, sandals and dolls.

On September 12, 2017, they reformed for a second time, this time as a five-members, to celebrate a fifteen-year birthday, embarked on a tour of sold-out shows all over Brazil, the 15 Anos Tour. In followed, he released his first unreleased song since 2005, "Bailando". And, on February 1, 2019 the fifth studio album, Les 5inq, was released.  On January 24, 2019, a new hiatus was announced for an indefinite time. It is unknown if Rouge will reunite after this new hiatus.

Biography

2002: Popstars formation

The origins of the group lie in the talent show Popstars, produced by RGB and broadcast in Brazil by SBT and Disney Channel from April 27 to September 7, 2002. The aim of the show was to form a pop girl group in Brazil and auditions were held country-wide. Over 20 episodes, candidates were whittled down by a panel of five judges. After five qualifying rounds, eight girls were selected for the final stage that and the judges selected Aline Wirley, Fantine Thó, Karin Hils, Li Martins (at the time known as Patrícia Lissa) and Luciana Andrade. The name chosen for the group was Rouge "because it has five letters and also because in French it means red, a color associated with sensuality [...] and it's pop!".

2002–03: Rouge, C'est La Vie and Andrade's departure
After the talent show, the band signed the agreement with Sony Music and RGB Entertainment, an international producer, producer of the Popstars serie in Brazil and Argentina, the self-titled debut album Rouge, released August 19, 2002, had 14 tracks, being the majority of them of the music producer Rick Bonadio. The record bet heavily on the band and distributed around 150,000 copies of the debut album in the stores already in first consignment. The album, reached the mark of 750,000 copies sold in only the first two months of sales. His Lead single was "Não Dá para Resistir", Its follow-up single, "Ragatanga", a track with a featured by Las Ketchup, winning the charts quickly, even with its unintelligible lyrics. The song reached the first position of the radios, remaining for 11 consecutive weeks in the first place. After five months, the album had sold 1 million copies. Rouge sold more than 1,2 million copies and was Brazil's second best selling album in 2002. The third single "Beijo Molhado", it was also a hit on the radios. Also the group released the remix album titled Rouge Remixes, selling 150 thousand copies, receiving certificate of gold, and the video album O Sonho de Ser Uma Popstar, bringing its first show.

On May 4, 2003, the Rouge released their second album, C'est La Vie, The album mixes sweetheart ballads with pop music, in addition to mixing with the zouk dance. According to the members of the band, the first album was already ready for the band that won the contest, already on the second album, they participated in the production process and introduced their compositions to work. The example is the song "Um Anjo Veio Me Falar", composed by the five members. Also part of the production process was the change of look of the five girls, who started to wear much more modern and superhero clothes, as well as hair and makeup. The album sold 100,000 copies in just the first week, the first single "Brilha La Luna" was among the most played on radios all over Brazil. Also released as singles were the songs "Um Anjo Veio Me Falar" and "Vem Cair na Zueira", which reached the Top 20 in Brazil, Argentina, Portugal and Angola. C'est La Vie in total, sold over 350,000 copies. On February 11, 2004, Luciana Andrade announced her departure from the group, after not adapting to the style of music they were performing, and also for not having adapted to sudden fame, besides wanting to make another type of sound like folk and the rock. Although Luciana Andrade was the leading voice of the group, at the time, the media reported that the girls would earn little, around R$500 for each show, while the rest would be for the entrepreneurs. The other members said that her exit had a positive effect because it made them re-evaluate everything that was happening in their careers.

2004–06:  Blá Blá Blá, Mil e Uma Noites and breakup

On June 16, 2004, the group released Blá Blá Blá, is marked by the absence of Luciana Andrade. On the album the Rouge bets on a more aggressive and mature pop. From the album, four singles were taken: "Blá Blá Blá", "Sem Você" (which became the most successful songs on the album), "Vem Dançar" and "Pá Pá Lá Lá" (who achieved more modest success). The members themselves composed several tracks on this album. There is a multimedia computer track that opens as a CD-ROM containing games with the band members. In that same year the group received the Prize of Better Band by the Academia Brasileira de Letras. Blá Blá Blá sold more than 150,000 copies.

The following year they released the album Mil e Uma Noites, in 2005. The album featured six previously unreleased songs, featuring the hit song "Vem Habib (Wala Wala)", and went Gold (50,000 copies sold). Since then, no new Rouge material has been announced or released. With the end of the contract with Sony Music and the non renewal of the same, the group ends up to separate in June 2006.

2007–11: Solo careers and reunion plans
Patricia Martins changed her name to Li Martins in 2007. She became a musical actress and starred some plays, including the Brazilian montage of musical Miss Saigon and The Beauty and the Beast. She released few singles by Walt Disney Records as the Brazilian version of the High School Musical's song "Gotta Go My Own Way", entitled "Vou Ser do Jeito Que Sou (en: I'll Be The Way I Am). In 2011 the Brazilian producer  E.Motion released the single "Promise (Till The End Of Time)" featuring Lissah and DJ Tonanni. Luciana Andrade was prevented from release an album for 7 years, because breaking the contract in 2004. During this period she did backing vocals for famous singers and participated in festivals and music events. Luciana also recorded many live songs for her fans and made some pocket during this years. For a long time she refused to sing Rouge's songs, but in 2008 she returned to sing songs like "Um Anjo Veio Me Falar". In 2010 the ban for breaking the contract in 2004 is over and she released the independent album Tão Diferente (en: So Different) with live songs recorded at pocket shows and 4 studio recordings. In the same year she released a free digital album, Ao Vivo Music (en: Live Music). She also participates in musical, she starred in Cinderella.

Aline Silva change her name to Aline Wirley and, in 2006, planned to release a pop album, but was canceled. In 2009 release a samba album Saudade do Samba (en: I Miss the Samba) and received good reviews, but unsuccessfully sales. Currently she participates in musicals such as Hairspray, Hair and Aladdin. Karin Hils tried to release an album, but failed to record. In 2008/2009 worked as a backing vocalist for the rapper Tulio Dek. In 2010 she played a role in the Brazilian montage of Hairspray, as Motormouth Maybelle. In 2012, she portrayed Bernardete in Rede Globo's Aquele Beijo.

Before moving to the Netherlands Fantine formed the Thó Band with her brother Jonathan Thó and release some singles and music videos.  Fantine continuously writes and records with artist such as Clay Perry, currently on tour with Julio Iglesias, Jean Dolabella, former drummer of Sepultura and Marcelo Lima who is known to collaborate with George Benson.  Her album "Dusty but New" is a live recording session at Sandlane Studios from the Netherlands produced by Joost van den Broek composer and member of the band "After Forever".  The album is a combination of songs written between 1996 and now and available for free download on soundcloud. www.soundcloud.com/fantine-tho.  Fantine is taking part in The Voice of Holland season 4, singles available for download on iTunes.

In 2010 the fans started a petition to the group's return. The intention of the petition was recording a DVD celebrating 10 years of career in 2012. The petition started on the Internet, but received attention from the television because of the video aired on YouTube and had millions of views. In a few months, the Twitter of 5 members began to have thousands of messages asking for the return of the Rouge. In 2011, Li (formerly known as Patricia), Aline and Karin accepted a return, and Sony BMG showed interest in the DVD recording, but the fight between Luciana and Fantine was a hindrance to the return. Recently, Fantine said she'd stumble back to the group as long as they record new songs. Luciana said in an interview that she had no interest in returning to the group.

2012–16: Comeback attempt and avoidance
In late 2012, rumours about a return restarted on social networks, specially Twitter, as Rick Bonadio, producer of the band and judge of Popstars show, posted the hashtag #VoltaRouge (en: Come Back Rouge).  Some meetings of the girls were noticed and published through the web. Officially, a return of the band was confirmed by Bonadio and the girls itself, although Luciana Andrade refused to join the band members, saying that she needed to be truthful with herself and her decision. Luciana also said that "They are Rouge, the girls that stayed. They are the soul of the group, so they are the ones who must come back".
A tour commemorating 10 years of creation of the group was confirmed for 2013, in Brazil. Along with it, a new Realitty Show for Multishow, Fabrica de Estrelas broadcast was announced for Bonadio to select girls for a new girlgroup. Rouge will have some appearances on the show showing the process of composition, recording and release of two new singles.

The new single, "Tudo É Rouge" (en: It's All Rouge) was confirmed for releasing April 2013, along with the start of the new reality show. Fantine shares that she went scouting for songs knowing Rouge would soon be recording, Luke Christopher, songwriter and rapper who works alongside Common, sent them "No Feeling", "love at first sight" said Fantine.  Karin and Fantine wrote the Portuguese version of the original song and released "Tudo Outra Vez" (en: All again).

Bonadio and Lissah/Patricia said in interviews that "it's not a goodbye tour. We don't discard the possibility of a definitive come back".
The original come back plans include a three months tour in Brazil, a live CD-DVD release, and a few new songs.

Despite all efforts, though, bureaucracy got in their way as they were not the legal owners of the name and brand Rouge, this being owned by their previous recording label. Bonadio and the girls decided on quitting the plans for a return as well as the release of single "Tudo É Rouge", and an apologizing letter for the fans was released through social media.

In 2015, Patrícia (now going with stage name Li Martins, her middle and surname respectively) joined the cast for reality TV show A Fazenda (Brazilian version of Swedish Reality Show The Farm) in Rede Record channel. Some comments she made in the show led fans to believe new comeback plans have been discussed with the girls, but no official information was released yet.

2017–2019: Return and fifth studio album Les 5inq

In August 2017 the 15th anniversary of the Rouge was intensely celebrated by the fans and all the former members. The following month, the official profile of the "Tea House of Alice", show published a pink banner with the words: "If alone they already cause, imagine together." The image caused an uproar among fans, who began speculating that the group might be the theme of one of the parties. On September 12, the profile released a pink and glittery image, alluding to the cover of the first album and promising an official statement the next day. The show not only marks the 15 years of the group, but also the return of Luciana Andrade. On September 13 was announced the return of the group with the original formation on October 13. On September 14, tickets were put up for sale and sold out in a minute. But as there were problems with some purchases, it was still possible to get some tickets. After three hours, the organization of the event announced that the five thousand tickets had been exhausted and an extra show was scheduled for the following day. The show reverberated and was so intense that the group decided to announce a new tour of the main capitals of Brazil in 2018. And on October 15, one day after the second session of the Tea Rouge in Rio de Janeiro, Karin Hills announced in his Instagram teaser of #RougeDoc, documentary containing the backstage of the show. On October 26, sales for the São Paulo show began on November 25, and just as in Rio, the 7,000 tickets offered for sale sold out in just over 3 hours. The site responsible for the purchase of the tickets did not withstand such high demand and remained out of the air for a few minutes. According to the company responsible, about 240,000 people accessed the site at the same time. The virtual queue has reached almost 20,000 people. Which caused a great inconvenience with the public. A new extra show was scheduled for December 2, and was sold out the same day. In October 2017, it was confirmed that Rouge had returned definitively.  On November 29, the group signed again with Sony Music Brasil and on December 1, 2017 their complete discography was made available for sale and streaming on digital platforms. After the digital release, the four albums reached the Top 10 of the Brazilian iTunes charts, seven songs being in the Top 100 singles, in addition to seven songs entering Brazil's Spotify Top 200.

The group's comeback first single, "Bailando" was released January 2018. On August 21, 2018, the group announced their second single after the return, "Dona da Minha Vida". The track was officially released on August 31. On September 6, the group announced the release of an extended play (EP) before the entire album exclusively on Gazeta TV's show Todos Seu, presented by Ronnie Von, opting for the program to tell the information because the host was the only one to open space for the members to divulge his solo work during the period that the group had closed the activities. On October 2, the group announced on the social networks the title of the EP as 5, in reference to the fact that it is their fifth unpublished work, in addition to containing five tracks, revealing that the release would be on the 8th of that month. On January 19, 2019 was released "Solo Tu", which was chosen as single through a vote in Spotify.

On January 24, 2019, the group announced through its official pages that they would enter into an indefinite break and on February 1 the fifth album Les Les 5inq was released and on the 4th, the Rouge Sessions - De Portas Abertas.

Advertising
Even before the Rouge group became a success, there was already a planning by its producers to launch several products using the name of the members of the group, and the brand Rouge itself. Initially, the group starred commercials of Marisa's women's store network, campaigning for Mother's Day and Christmas, and even with autographed stickers of the members being distributed through Marisa stores throughout the country. Baby Brink dolls were also produced for the five members of the group, which were distributed as of September 9, 2003. The group also closed with a contract with Arcor, a company that produced chewing gum, confectionery and Easter eggs, all with the image of the girls. More than seven types of products were produced to promote the Rouge group.

In 2003, Editora Abril launched the illustrated Rouge book, with 180 figurines for fans of the group to collect and the following year, Kromo Publishing launched a picture book composed of 72 photos of Rouge girls for fans to collect and paste in the picture book. The quality of the chromos was well connoted by the collectors of figurine albums. The group also launched the "Sandália Rouge" by Grendene, shortly after becoming a media success, the following year they launched a new sandal, which came with a pendant. The last launch with Grendene, was the Tamanco Rouge, a great sales success. There has also been a brand of school products launched at the height of the group, however, due to the fact that it is a rarity, it is difficult to know which company was responsible for this release.

In 2011, Tilibra launched a line of notebooks inspired by the group, with a different color for each notebook.

Legacy
During their career, Rouge became one of Brazil's record-breaking acts, with more than 6 million albums sold, being the best-selling girl group in Brazil and Latin America. One of the group's albums also appears in the list of the best selling albums in the history of the Brazilian music industry – the debut album of the group, certificated double platinum. Described as the "Brazilian Spice Girls", some vehicles credited the group for being part of Brazilian pop; Some critics called them "laboratory rats" and "pop cinderellas."

Eduardo Coelho of ‘’Fatos Desconhecidos’’ website revered the reality show Popstars for revealing the group, writing that "even with the pros and cons of the format, something that is undeniable with regards to reality shows on national soil is that they at least created, shaped and produced a true phenomenon called: Rouge, in the year 2002". The writer also praised the group's most successful song "Ragatanga", claiming it impossible to forget and saying its choreography is epic. Cristiano Freitas, from the website A Escotilha, defined the contribution of the group to Brazilian pop as a "major phenomenon of the genre ever revealed in Brazil." Diário do Nordeste credited the group for giving “face to pure Brazilian pop music, bringing the “girl band” concept to Brazil, popularized especially by the Spice Girls. Journalist Diego Bargas from the site Folha compared Rouge even further to the Spice Girls, stating that both have many similarities. Like Rouge, the British quintet experienced the meteoric success still young; at their career momentum, they both suffered the departure of a member. Both groups had little time in total activity, but they have kept many fans.”

Several artists cited Rouge as an influence in some aspect in their careers; among them are the Brazilian singers Anitta, Pabllo Vittar, Gloria Groove, the girl group Girls, and the actors Maisa Silva, Tiago Abravanel, and Fernanda Souza.

Member Timeline

Discography

 Rouge (2002)
 C'est La Vie (2003)
 Blá Blá Blá (2004)
 Mil e Uma Noites (2005)
 Les 5inq (2019)

Concert tours
Headlining
 Popstar Tour (2002—03)
 C'est La Vie Tour (2003—04)
 Blá Blá Blá Tour (2004)
 Mil e Uma Noites Tour (2005)
 15 Anos Tour (2018)

Co-headlining
 Planeta Pop: Rouge & Br'oz Tour (2004)

Promotional tours
 Chá Rouge Tour (2017–22)

Filmography

Television

Film

Awards and nominations

See also

 List of best-selling girl groups
 List of girl groups

References

External links
 Rouge Website

 
Brazilian dance music groups
Brazilian pop music groups
Musical groups established in 2002
Musical groups disestablished in 2006
Musical groups reestablished in 2017
Musical groups disestablished in 2019
Musical groups from São Paulo
2002 establishments in Brazil
Sony BMG artists
Vocal quintets
Teen pop groups
Brazilian vocal groups
Popstars winners
Brazilian girl groups
Feminist musicians